Craig McGinlay is a Scottish actor, best known for playing Sir Percival in King Arthur: Legend of the Sword.

Early life
McGinlay grew up in Paisley just outside Gleniffer Braes near Glasgow. His parents are Ronnie (a lawyer) and Hazel. McGinlay earned a sports science degree at University of Stirling and was a rugby player until an injury forced him to leave the sport in 2004. He became a fitness coach until being scouted by a Glasgow modelling agency in 2013.

Career
Moving to London in 2014, McGinlay signed with Independent Talent Agency and Select Model Management in London as well as agencies in Milan, Newcastle and Manchester. He has modelled for Nike, Trespass, Ray-Ban and Land Rover. McGinlay was named Breakthrough Star of the Year at the 2015 Scottish Style Awards. After starring in a Haig whisky commercial directed by Guy Ritchie, McGinlay was offered the role of Percival in King Arthur: Legend of the Sword which was directed by Ritchie and co-starred David Beckham.

Filmography

References

External links

Living people
Scottish male film actors
21st-century Scottish male actors
21st-century British male actors
British male film actors
Place of birth missing (living people)
British male models
1986 births